Black Dog is the debut novel by author Stephen Booth in the Cooper and Fry series of novels, set in the Peak District. Black Dog won the 2001 Barry Award for the Best British Crime Novel.

Synopsis
A teenager goes missing and her body is found by a retired miner, who is not completely forthcoming with the police. DC Ben Cooper, a local, must work with DC Diane Fry, who is new to the area, to solve the crime.

External links
 http://www.stephen-booth.com/new%20blackdog.htm

References

2000 British novels
Novels set in Derbyshire
Barry Award-winning works
2000 debut novels
HarperCollins books